Martin Friedman may refer to:
 Marty Friedman (born 1962), an American guitarist
 Marty Friedman (basketball) (1889–1986), an American basketball player and coach
 Martin Friedman (museum director) (1925/26–2016), an American museum curator

See also
 Martin Freedman, a Candian judge
 Martin Freeman (disambiguation)